Sharon is an unincorporated community located on Mississippi Highway 43 in Madison County, Mississippi, United States. Sharon is located within the Jackson Metropolitan Statistical Area.

Although an unincorporated community, Sharon has a post office and zip code of 39163.

History
Between 1837 and 1873, Sharon was home to an early female seminary called Sharon Female College.  Sharon was also home to Madison College, founded in 1845.

Notable natives and residents
 James Champlain — blind philanthropist involved in the founding of the Mississippi School for the Blind.
 K. C. Douglas — blues musician.

References

Unincorporated communities in Madison County, Mississippi
Unincorporated communities in Mississippi